Bud and Lou are a pair of spotted hyenas that appear in DC Comics. Their names are references to the comedy duo Abbott and Costello.

Fictional biography
Bud and Lou are spotted hyenas who are the pets of Harley Quinn. When Harley Quinn wanted to go solo and formed her gang, their first mission was to free Bud and Lou from the Gotham City Zoo.

At some point, white collar criminals stole Bud and Lou from Harley Quinn so that they can auction them off as exotic pets. Upon locating the place of the auction, Harley Quinn reclaimed her hyenas and had Poison Ivy wreck the place.

In The New 52 reboot of DC's continuity, Bud and Lou are still featured as Harley Quinn's pets. In the "Death of the Family" storyline in an attempt to drive Harley mad, Joker gives them rabies and sics them on her, forcing Harley to (apparently) kill them in self-defense. In Harley Quinn's solo series it is revealed that Bud and Lou survived the ordeal and recovered at a zoo, where they sired puppies with several of the zoo's female hyenas.

Other versions
 Bud and Lou appear in Scooby-Doo! Team Up #42. While Harley Quinn "teams-up" with Mystery Incorporated, the Joker arrives with the Hyenas, to steal back a package from Harley that she assumed to be her Christmas present. Oddly enough, Harley calls them by the names of Scooby and Scrappy, much to the real Scooby's bewilderment.
 The DCAU versions of Bud and Lou also make an appearance in the intercompany comic crossover Batman/Teenage Mutant Ninja Turtles Adventures, where they have been turned into huge humanoid mutants after the Joker has taken over the Foot Clan and its mutagen resources. Additionally, two hyena mutants named Jester Jim and Jester Joe, apparently inspired by Bud and Lou, appear in the Summer Shorts special "Teenage Mecha Ninja Turtles" of the 2012 TMNT TV series.

In other media

Television
 Bud and Lou appear in four episodes of Batman: The Animated Series, and five more in The New Batman Adventures. They first show up in "The Man Who Killed Batman". However, they are not named until the Joker refers to them in the episode "Joker's Millions". Before this, Harley Quinn simply refers to them as her "babies".
 Similar hyenas appear in The Batman episode "The Laughing Cat". They appear as the gifts to Joker from hunter Kilgore Steed. Catwoman was able to get control over them since hyenas are related to cats.
 Bud and Lou appear in Krypto the Superdog where Bud is voiced by Peter Kelamis and Lou is voiced by Lee Tockar. Both hyenas have red fur with black spots and black rings around their eyes. Bud wears a purple collar, has a black right front paw, and speaks in a higher voice. Lou wears a green collar, has a black left front paw and right hind paw, and speaks in a more gravelly voice. Both hyenas have a distinctive odor. This was first mentioned by Ace in the episode "The Cat and the Bat". Later on, in the episode "Funny Business", Ace told Krypto he could smell their evil. Like their master, Bud and Lou love to laugh maniacally and play jokes on their foes. Like the other animal characters on this show, they also seem to be quite intelligent (a reference to the intelligence of actual hyenas). For instance, in "Bat Hound and the Robin", while stealing pillowcases for The Joker to carry loot in, they deduced that the pillowcases made of one material would be better because pillowcases made from the other fabric would shrink in the wash, meaning less loot could be put in them. Also, the Joker has given the hyenas items to use in combating Bat-Hound. At one point in "The Dark Hound Strikes!", Bud pretended to give himself up. When Ace seized Bud's collar in his fangs, he received an electric shock. Bud then announced he had a joy-buzzer collar and laughed. In "Funny Business", the hyenas had a bubble shooter which shot special "giggle bubbles". These bubbles caused Ace to laugh uncontrollably, a mild version of Joker's laughing venom.
 Bud and Lou appeared in the Justice League Action episode "Garden of Evil". At the time when Poison Ivy was controlling Swamp Thing into helping her take control of Gotham City, Harley Quinn fought Vixen all the way to the Gotham City Zoo where Harley Quinn stated that Poison Ivy's plot was the advantage she needed to free Bud and Lou. Vixen uses the abilities of a lion to scare Bud and Lou back into their cages as Vixen states that hyenas are afraid of lions.
 Bud and Lou appear in season 2 of Harley Quinn as Harley's pets.
 They also appear in the 2019 TV series DC Super Hero Girls episode, #BeastsInShow, called Ethel and Lucy being females. They were stolen from the Metropolis Zoo by Harley Quinn until they got loose and made it to the Metropolis Annual Dog Show. After being defeated by Krypto the Superdog and Ace the Bat-hound, they are kicked out of the dog show until they arrive with Harley, being made up.

Film
 In the 2019 animated film Batman: Hush, three of Harley Quinn's pet hyenas appear. They are named Larry, Moe and Shemp, a reference to the comedy team The Three Stooges.
 In the film Birds of Prey (and the Fantabulous Emancipation of One Harley Quinn), Harley Quinn "purchases" a pet hyena, who she names Bruce after "that hunky Wayne guy". This is because the budget of the film could only afford one CGI hyena.

Video games
 Bud and Lou both also appear in Batman: Arkham City. Penguin has them killed and stuffed at his base in The Cyrus Pinkney Institute for Natural History. They were on display as exhibits.
 Bud and Lou both appear in Injustice 2. They have been trained by Harley Quinn and appear as one of Harley Quinn's character powers as well as her Supermove. They also occasionally appear in her battle intros. In one she threatens to make Red Hood their new chew toy, causing Red Hood to ask "Where's the Bat-Hound when I need him", referencing Ace the Bat-Hound's antagonist relationship with the hyenas in some media. In another she threatens to "make a mess of [Black Manta's] costume", causing Black Manta to respond with "I'll feed you to your hyenas", referencing her as the hyenas' master.

References

Fictional hyenas
DC Comics supervillains
Batman characters
Characters created by Paul Dini
DC Comics animals